Jean-Pierre Fandel (born 4 March 1927) was a Luxembourgian footballer. He played in six matches for the Luxembourg national football team from 1955 to 1958.

References

External links
 

1927 births
Possibly living people
Luxembourgian footballers
Luxembourg international footballers
Place of birth missing (living people)
Association football defenders
Stade Dudelange players